The 1993–94 Lithuanian Hockey League season was the third season of the Lithuanian Hockey League, the top level of ice hockey in Lithuania. Five teams participated in the league, and SC Energija won the championship.

Standings

External links
Season on hockeyarchives.info

Lithuanian Hockey League
Lithuania Hockey League seasons
Lith